"Aiken Drum" (Roud 2571) is a popular Scottish folk song and nursery rhyme, which probably has its origins in a Jacobite song about the Battle of Sheriffmuir (1715).

Lyrics

Modern versions of the lyrics include:
There was a man lived in the moon, lived in the moon, lived in the moon,
There was a man lived in the moon,
And his name was Aiken Drum.

Chorus
And he played upon a ladle, a ladle, a ladle,
And he played upon a ladle,
and his name was Aiken Drum.

And his hat was made of good cream cheese, of good cream cheese, of good cream cheese,
And his hat was made of good cream cheese,
And his name was Aiken Drum.

And his coat was made of good roast beef, of good roast beef, of good roast beef,
And his coat was made of good roast beef,
And his name was Aiken Drum.

And his buttons made of penny loaves, of penny loaves, of penny loaves,
And his buttons made of penny loaves,
And his name was Aiken Drum.

And his waistcoat was made of crust pies, of crust pies, of crust pies,
And his waistcoat was made of crust pies,
And his name was Aiken Drum.

And his breeches made of haggis bags, of haggis bags, of haggis bags,
And his breeches made of haggis bags,
And his name was Aiken Drum.

Other versions of the song include the lyrics:
His hat was made of guid cream cheese,
His coat was made of fine rost beef,
His buttons were made of bawbee baps, (bread rolls costing a halfpenny each)
His breeks (breeches) were made of haggis sacks,
His hair was made of spaghetti.

Origins 
The rhyme was first printed by James Hogg in Jacobite Reliques in 1820, as a Jacobite song about the Battle of Sheriffmuir (1715):
Ken ye how a Whig can fight, Aikendrum, Aikendrum 
Ken ye how a Whig can fight, Aikendrum 
He can fight the hero bright, with his heels and armour tight 
And the wind of heavenly night, Aikendrum, Aikendrum 
Is not Rowley in the right, Aikendrum!
Did ye hear of Sunderland, Aikendrum, Aikendrum 
Did ye hear of Sunderland, Aikendrum 
That man of high command, who has sworn to clear the land 
He has vanished from our strand, Aikendrum, Aikendrum, 
Or the eel has ta'en the sand, Aikendrum.
Donald's running 'round and 'round, Aikendrum, Aikendrum, 
Donald's running 'round and 'round, Aikendrum 
But the Chief cannot be found, and the Dutchmen they are drowned 
And King Jaime he is crowned, Aikendrum, Aikendrum 
But the dogs will get a stound, Aikendrum.
We have heard of Whigs galore, Aikendrum, Aikendrum 
We have heard of Whigs galore, Aikendrum 
But we've sought the country o'er, with cannon and claymore, 
And still they are before, Aikendrum, Aikendrum 
We may seek forevermore, Aikendrum!
Ken ye how to gain a Whig, Aikendrum, Aikendrum 
Ken ye how to gain a Whig, Aikendrum 
Look Jolly, blythe and big, take his ain blest side and prig, 
And the poor, worm-eaten Whig, Aikendrum, Aikendrum 
For opposition's sake you will win!

Sir Walter Scott in his novel The Antiquary (1816) refers to Aiken Drum in a story told by an old beggar about the origins of what has been perceived by the protagonist as a Roman fort. The beggar tells him that it was actually built by him and others for "auld Aiken Drum's bridal" and that one of the masons cut the shape of a ladle into the stone as a joke on the bridegroom. The reference suggests that the rhyme, and particularly the chorus, was well enough known in the early nineteenth century for the joke to be understood.

The Brownie of Blednoch

Aiken Drum is also the name given by the Scottish poet William Nicholson to the brownie in his poem "The Brownie of Blednoch" (1825). Although this has led some folklorists to speculate that the song may derive from older fairy legends, there is no evidence of the name being used for a brownie prior to Nicholson.

Performances

The Scottish folk group The Singing Kettle performs this song for children in an interactive way by allowing the children to decide the foods of which Aiken Drum is made. A version is included on their CD Singalong Songs from Scotland, produced in 2003 for Smithsonian Folkways Recordings.

Popular Armenian-Canadian children's singer Raffi played a version of the song, called "Aikendrum", on his album Singable Songs for the Very Young (1976). Raffi's version of the song replaces the various foods with ones that would be more familiar to an American audience: spaghetti for Aikendrum's hair, meatballs for his eyes, cheese for his nose, and pizza for his mouth. This version was also the Barney & Friends version.

The album Classic Scots Ballads (1961) by Ewan MacColl and Peggy Seeger includes a recording of this song with the original lyrics.

In popular culture
Aiken Drum is the name chosen for one of the main characters in the science fiction series The Saga of Pliocene Exile.

See also

References

Scottish folk songs
Scottish nursery rhymes
Songs about the Moon
Songs about fictional male characters
Scottish children's songs
Traditional children's songs
Year of song unknown
Songwriter unknown